Kenshiro Michael Lontok Daniels (born January 13, 1995) is a Filipino professional footballer who plays as a forward for Sukhothai in the Thai League 1, and the Philippines national team. He was born in Newport Beach to Hollywood actor and retired kickboxer Gary Daniels and a Filipino mother.

Club career

Kaya
Daniels began his professional career with the Kaya FC of the United Football League in 2013.

In June 2018, after his 5-year spell, Daniels parted ways with Kaya F.C.-Iloilo and moved in Malaysia Super League., alongside Robert Lopez Mendy, Antonio Ugarte, and Miguel Tanton.

International career
Daniels was born in Irvine, California to an English father and a Filipino mother which made him eligible to play for England, Philippines and United States.

Daniels made his international debut for the Philippines as a substitute in a 0–0 draw over Malaysia in Selayang, Malaysia on March 1, 2014.

International goals
Scores and results list the Philippines' goal tally first.

Personal life
Daniels is not of Japanese descent. His given name was derived from Kenshiro, the protagonist of the Fist of the North Star. His father Gary Daniels named him after the character. His father, an actor by profession, portrayed the character in the American film adaptation which premiered in 1995, the year the younger Daniels was born.

Career statistics

Club

Notes

References

External links

 

1995 births
Living people
Filipino footballers
Philippines international footballers
Citizens of the Philippines through descent
Filipino people of English descent
American soccer players
Association football forwards
Association football midfielders
American people of English descent
American sportspeople of Filipino descent
Sportspeople from Irvine, California
Kaya F.C. players
Kenshiro Daniels
Kenshiro Daniels